The McKinney Courier-Gazette is a daily newspaper published in McKinney, Texas, covering Collin County.

1013 Communications acquired it from American Community Newspapers in 2011.

The newspaper has a daily circulation as well as daily online contribution.

References

External links
 McKinney Courier-Gazette

McKinney Courier-Gazette